Khanom sot sai, also known as khanom sai sai, is a Thai dessert with a sweet filling. It is made up of coconut and palm sugar, and the filling is covered with steamed rice flour mixed with coconut cream. It was used at Thai wedding ceremonies in ancient times. It is traditionally packed by wrapping in a banana leaf.

See also
 List of Thai desserts

External links 
Patchmon's Thai Desserts. Retrieved October 1. 2016. from http://www.thaidesserts.ca/#!steamed-flour-with-coconut-filling/c1vge
Thai Dessert. Retrieved October 1. 2016. from http://tankitchen-dessert.blogspot.com/2009/04/khanom-sod-sai-filled-coconut-cream.html
Thai Wisdom: Wrappers in Thai Dessert. Retrieved October 1. 2016. from http://www.mthai.com/en/thaiculture/1321.html
JOY B. Thai Dessert: Khanom Sai Sai (Sweet Stuffed Dough). Retrieved October 1. 2016. from http://www.joysthaifood.com/desserts/thai-dessert-khanom-sai-sai-sweet-stuffed-dough/
Tanwiratchada. Khanom Sod Sai (Filled Coconut Cream). Retrieved October 1. 2016. from http://en.petitchef.com/recipes/dessert/khanom-sod-sai-

Thai desserts and snacks
Foods containing coconut
Stuffed desserts
Steamed foods
Wedding food